David W. Graves (born 1958) is an American clergyman in the United Methodist Church who is bishop of the Alabama-West Florida Conference. He was elected July 13, 2016 to the episcopacy at the Southeastern Jurisdictional Conference quadrennial meeting at Lake Junaluska, N.C. He has been assigned for the next four years to the Alabama West-Florida Conference.

Dismissal of complaint against Jeff Sessions
On June 18, 2018, over 600 members of the United Methodist Church issued a formal complaint to the church, accusing fellow member Jeff Sessions of racial discrimination, child abuse, and spreading "doctrines contrary to the standards of doctrine of the United Methodist Church." As attorney general in the Trump administration, Sessions was overseeing the administration's policy of family separation at the border. Sessions had defended this policy and used the Bible to justify his actions, which the complaint argued was both contrary to the values espoused by the UMC and against the church's Book of Discipline. On June 14, Sessions had cited Romans 13, which reminds readers that Christians should also follow secular law, to justify his actions and the administration's policy. Many biblical scholars and fellow Methodists harshly criticized Sessions for his interpretation of the text, with one scholar calling it cherry picking because Sessions at the same time ignored Bible passages that called for people to defend children. The family separation policy has faced bipartisan criticism in Congress, and the Trump administration received a federal court order to reunite children separated from their parents.

Rev. Debora Bishop, who is district superintendent of the church's Alabama-West Florida Conference (in which Sessions' home church is located), dismissed the complaint on July 30, writing that a government official's actions in their official capacity are separate from their actions as a private person. The Conference's resident bishop David Graves agreed with Rev. Bishop's opinion, arguing that "political action is not personal conduct when the political officer is carrying out official policy". He also said that because Sessions is a layperson his actions aren't "covered by the chargeable offense provisions of The Book of Discipline."

Seemingly against his earlier decision on Sessions, Graves and many other United Methodist bishops has issued statements calling for the reunification of families.

Education 
 Bachelor of Science in Business Administration, University of Tennessee, Knoxville, TN
 Master of Divinity, Candler School of Theology, Emory University, Atlanta, GA

Personal life 
Graves is married to Nancy Graves. Together they have two children, Casey and Gregg.

Awards 
Clergy Denman Award, 2013

Ordained Ministry
Fountain City UMC | Knoxville, Tenn.
Second UMC | Knoxville, Tenn.
Hixson UMC | Chattanooga, Tenn.
Pastor, St. Matthew and Mountainview UMC | Kingsport, Tenn.
Senior Pastor, Ooltewah UMC | Ooltewah, Tenn.
District Superintendent, Kingsport District | Kingsport, Tenn.
Senior Pastor, Church Street UMC | Knoxville, Tenn.

References

https://www.umnews.org/en/news/complaints-against-sessions-dismissed

Links
http://www.davidwgraves.com/ 

20th-century Methodist ministers
21st-century Methodist ministers
1958 births
American sermon writers
Emory University alumni
Living people
Trump administration controversies
United Methodist bishops of the Southeastern Jurisdiction